This is a list of British television related events from 1988.

Events

January
1 January 
New Year's Day highlights on BBC1 include the network television premiere of Roger Donaldson's 1984 historical drama, The Bounty, starring Mel Gibson and Anthony Hopkins.
BBC2 airs a five-hour Whistle Test special to welcome in 1988 which aired from 9:35pm on New Year's Eve to 2:55am on New Year's Day.  The special takes a look back through the archives in what is the programme's final outing. It will be three decades later in 2018 before a new edition of the programme is broadcast.
Michael Grade takes on the role of Chief Executive of Channel 4.
From that day, each programme on ITV is no longer preceded by the identifier of the regional company that had produced the show.
2 January – No. 73 is broadcast for the final time on ITV. It had been known as 7T3 since January.
4 January – BBC1 moves the repeat episode of Neighbours to a 5:35pm evening slot, the decision to do this having been made by controller Michael Grade on the advice of his daughter.
5 January – Actor Rowan Atkinson launches the new Comic Relief charity appeal.
6 January – All ITV regions network Emmerdale Farm in the Wednesday and Thursday 6:30pm slot.
8 January – Launch of LWT News, a news service from London Weekend Television providing at least eight bulletins each weekend for the ITV London region and created as a response to IBA concerns about the lack of a proper news service in London at weekends.
9 January – The network television premiere of the 1984 film Supergirl on ITV, starring Helen Slater.
11 January 
The US animated series The Real Ghostbusters, based on the hit 1984 Ghostbusters movie makes its UK debut on Children's ITV.  
Debut of the game show Fifteen to One on Channel 4, presented by William G. Stewart. The show's first winner is Gareth McMullan, a teacher from Northern Ireland.
14 January – Talks between TV-am's management and the ACTT union begin, aiming to resolve the ongoing strike.
 25 January – TVS launches Late Night Late and gradually extends its broadcast hours over the next few months.
25–29 January – TV-am airs a week of live broadcasts from Sydney to celebrate Australia's bicentenary and featuring Anne Diamond and Mike Morris.
30 January – The network television premiere of the 1983 James Bond film Octopussy on ITV, starring Roger Moore.

February
1 February 
TV-am celebrates its fifth birthday, with Anne Diamond being joined by Richard Keys, Gyles Brandreth, Su Pollard and Jimmy Greaves. It is the first time has been able to get its daily output down to an hour of pre-recorded material since the beginning of the strike. However, the station continues to air imports of old US shows for several months.
The deadline on which the ACTT must accept TV-am's "Ten Point Plan" aimed at resolving the strike. However, the plan is rejected by a ballot and the union refuses to resume negotiations.
5 February – The inaugural Red Nose Day sees Comic Relief air its first A Night of Comic Relief fundraiser on BBC1.
9 February – MPs vote in favour of allowing television cameras into the House of Commons.
10 February – Debut of Moondial, a six-part series adapted from the novel by Helen Cresswell on BBC1. The series is repeated by BBC1 in 1990.
13 February 
Scottish and Granada begin 24-hour broadcasting. 
Central which had been keeping its transmitters on the air since last April by filling its closedown period with its Jobfinder service, launches a full overnight schedule. Jobfinder also launches on both Granada and Scottish and all three companies broadcast Jobfinder for one hour beginning at 4am.
13–28 February – The 1988 Winter Olympics are held in Calgary, Alberta, Canada and is broadcast to television audiences around the world. In the UK, the BBC provides around five hours of live and recorded coverage each day.
15 February 
Channel 4 starts broadcasting into the early hours, closing down between 2am and 3am. Previously, Channel 4 had closed down at just after midnight.
An early morning 60-minute news programme, ITN Early Morning News is launched but is only available in areas which have 24-hour broadcasting. The first 30 minutes of the programme includes a full broadcast of ITN's international news bulletin ITN World News. The new bulletin is supplemented by the launch of additional, brief news summaries which are broadcast at various points through the night.
The cult science-fiction comedy series Red Dwarf makes its debut on BBC2, starring Chris Barrie and Craig Charles.
16 February – TV-am Managing Director Bruce Gyngell sacks the station's locked out staff and calls a meeting of its remaining employees the following morning to announce that the ACTT will never again organise itself at TV-am's studios. His decision fails to resolve the crisis, however, as picketing continues and the quality of its output remains unchanged.
17 February – Debut of five-part crime drama The Fear on ITV, starring Iain Glen, Susannah Harker, Anthony Valentine, Jesse Birdsall, Jerome Flynn and Adrian Dunbar. It focuses about the story of Carl Galton is the enterprising leader of a criminal gang running a protection racket in North London represents a new breed seek to expand his underworld empire and takes on the old East End firms. The series continues on 16 March.
20 February 
Debut of the stunt-based game show You Bet! on ITV, presented by Bruce Forsyth.
London's Burning makes its debut as a regular series on ITV, having been developed from Jack Rosenthal's original 1986 film.

March
3 March – BBC1 airs Around the World with Willy Fog with former CBBC and Broom Cupboard presenter Andy Crane singing the theme tune. A special event called "National Willy Fog Day" which Crane invented will also appear on 28 April to air the final episode and celebrate the final broadcast. 
7 March – ITV's lunchtime news programme returns to the 1pm timeslot.
11 March – The final episode of the long-running children's series Play School is broadcast on BBC1, although repeats would continue until October. 
18 March – The final US edition of Top of the Pops is broadcast. 
19 March – Two off-duty British soldiers are killed after stumbling into an IRA funeral procession in Belfast. Footage of the incident is captured by journalists and widely broadcast.
21 March – Anglia's silver statue of a knight on horseback ident is consigned to history, having been used as Anglia's identity since the station went on the air 29 years earlier. It is replaced by a new identity, a quasi-heraldic stylised 'A' made of triangles, designed by Robinson Lambie-Nairn at a cost of £500,000. About Anglia is also given a new look to coincide with the ident change.
22 March – Prime Minister Margaret Thatcher tells the House of Commons that journalists have a "bounden duty" to assist the police investigation into the corporals killings by handing over their footage. Many have refused to do so fearing it could place them in danger.
23 March – Film of the corporals killings is seized from the BBC and ITN under the Prevention of Terrorism and Emergency Provisions Acts.
25 March – 
BBC2 shows Two of Us, a gay-themed television film. It was produced as part of the BBC Schools Scene programme and was intended for young adults. It confronted the Thatcherite government's attempt to ban gay sex education in schools via the controversial and since repealed section 28 legislation. Given this backdrop, the BBC opted not to show it during the day and it was screened late at night on this day, even though it was originally created for a school audience. In 1990, the play was finally shown during the day, when it was broadcast in a lunchtime slot.
The former MP, John Stonehouse, collapses on set during an edition of Central Weekend in Birmingham during the filming of a programme about missing people. He is given emergency medical treatment at the studio and taken to hospital, where he is diagnosed as having suffered from a minor heart attack.

April
1 April – The network television premiere of the Rankin/Bass animated film The Flight of Dragons on BBC1.
 3 April – Motormouth launches as ITV's new Saturday morning children's programme.
4 April – The original series of Crossroads airs for the last time on ITV. It returns in 2001 before being axed again in 2003.
6 April – ITV's chart show The Roxy airs for the last time.
7 April – Ireland has purchased the Welsh children's stop-motion animated series Fireman Sam for television broadcasting there. The show would debut on RTÉ1 with only the first series and will return to air a number of times on RTÉ2, what was known as Network 2 at the time, although viewers in Ireland with access to British television were able to see earlier transmissions including all four series and the Christmas Special with their original airdates.
10 April – Debut of East of the Moon on Channel 4, a new series for children based on fairy tales written by former Monty Python member Terry Jones and features his stories brought to life with live-action and animation and songs written and performed by Neil Innes.
15 April – The Pogues perform their controversial hit Streets of Sorrow/Birmingham Six, a song expressing support for those convicted over the Guildford and Birmingham pub bombings on the Ben Elton presented Channel 4 show Friday Night Live. The song is cut short, however, by a commercial break.
19 April – Liz Forgan becomes Channel 4's first official Director of Programmes.
 23 April-10 September – Two new Saturday morning magazine series are shown this Summer, On the Waterfront is aired for the first part of the season with UP2U taking over in mid-July. The same two shows are also shown the following Summer. 
28 April 
BBC1 airs the concluding episode of Around the World with Willy Fog.
ITV broadcasts Death on the Rock, a hugely controversial episode of Thames's This Week current affairs strand, investigating Operation Flavius which resulted in the SAS killing three members of the IRA in Gibraltar on 6 March.
30 April – Canadian singer Celine Dion wins the 1988 Eurovision Song Contest for Switzerland with the French language song Ne partez pas sans moi (Don't Leave Without Me).

May
9 May – The youth strand DEF II is launched on BBC2.
19 May – Anita Dobson makes her last appearance in EastEnders when her character, Angie Watts departs for a new life in Spain. 
23 May – Three gay rights activists invade the BBC studios during a Six O'Clock news bulletin on BBC1 to protest about the introduction of Section 28, a law preventing schools from teaching their students about homosexuality. Protesters can be heard chanting as Sue Lawley continues to read the news, prompting her to comment "we have been rather invaded by some people who we hope to be removing very shortly".
27 May – Almost all of the production areas at the BBC Television Centre are shut down after the discovery of asbestos fibres in the soundproof ceiling of TC5 during routine maintenance. It is also found in the coating of trusses supporting the studio grids. As a consequence, production teams are required to move from Television Centre to other BBC studios, such as Bristol and Birmingham. Work to remove the asbestos takes several months.
29–30 May – ITV stages its first Telethon, a 27-hour nationwide fundraising effort involving participation and input from all of the regional broadcasters around the country. Its aim is to raise money for disability charities across the UK. 
30 May 
Yorkshire Television resumes 24-hour broadcasting.
TV-am does not go on the air, with its airtime instead taken up by coverage of ITV's Telethon '88. The ACTT had asked its members to boycott the programme on that day and fearful of sparking a nationwide dispute, TV-am's acting Managing Director, Adrian Moore, allows ITV to use the early morning airtime.
31 May 
Debut of People, a thirteen-part series on BBC1 featuring human interest stories which is presented by Derek Jameson. He is joined by Jeni Barnett, Lucy Pilkington and Chris Serle.
Debut of Charles Wood's screenplay Tumbledown on BBC1, about the experiences of Scots Guard Robert Lawrence who was left paralysed after being shot in the head by a sniper at the Battle of Mount Tumbledown during the Falklands War. The film is shown again on 9 October.

June
1 June – Live horse racing is shown for the final time on ITV when it simulcasts Channel 4's coverage of the 1988 Epsom Derby. The sport would to return to ITV in 2017.
5 June – Channel 4 airs the Thames documentary Waldheim: A Commission of Inquiry, a programme investigating the history of the alleged Nazi conspirator Kurt Waldheim.
8 June
Presenter Russell Harty dies at the age of 53.
Media mogul Rupert Murdoch announces to the British Academy of Film and Television Arts his intention to launch a four-channel service on the soon to be launched Astra satellite. 
11 June – The Nelson Mandela 70th Birthday Tribute concert is staged at Wembley Stadium, London and is broadcast to 67 countries worldwide to an audience of 600 million. In the UK, it was broadcast on BBC2.
13 June – Presenter Frank Bough leaves the BBC after a News of the World exposé of his private life.
20 June – TVS and Channel Television commence 24-hour broadcasting.
21 June – BBC1 airs Crystal Clear, a film based on the award-winning play of the same name that deals with the subject of sight loss.

July
1 July – The Australian series The Flying Doctors makes its UK debut on BBC1. Initially aired on Fridays at 8:10pm, from 20 August, it is moved to a Saturday early evening slot.
4 July – Miami Vice returns to BBC1 after 10 months, however due to controversies over violence and drug use several of the episodes are not shown on the BBC, including one featuring a sympathetic IRA member played by Liam Neeson, and another which sees the death of a key character, "Larry" Zito played by John Diehl.
7 July – The Times reports that TVS have bought US production company MTM Enterprises for £190m.
15 July – London Weekend Television airs the final edition of its Friday evening programme The Six O'Clock Show. It is replaced by Friday Now!, a smaller scale current affairs programme from October.
17 July – After 1,576 episodes, Farming is broadcast on BBC1 for the final time. It is replaced the following week by Countryfile whose brief was to look at issues reflecting all aspects of the countryside rather than just focussing on farming.
19 July 
The Bill broadcasts the first episode of its fourth series and switches to a year-round serial format.
Debut of the UK version of the game show Wheel of Fortune on ITV, presented by Nicky Campbell with Angela Ekaette. 
26 July – Anna Wing makes her final appearance as EastEnders matriarch Lou Beale, dispensing words of wisdom and advice to her family before retiring to her bedroom to slip away. Her final words in the soap are: "That's you lot sorted. I can go now." The character had died by the following episode and at her funeral, her on-screen son Pete (Peter Dean) proposes a toast to that "bloody old bag". Wing herself died, at the age of 98 in 2013.
July – Stephen Barden is appointed as TV-am's new Managing Editor. With the station facing criticism from the IBA over the quality of its output, he acts quickly to improve matters. Repeats of imported US programmes finally come to an end, while new programming is launches and programmes such as Frost on Sunday, off air since the strike began are restored.

August
3 August – Brookside is moved from Tuesdays to Wednesdays which means the soap can now be seen on Mondays and Wednesdays.
4 August – The band All About Eve perform their single Martha's Harbour on Top of the Pops. The group, ready to do a mimed (as was BBC policy at the time) performance of their hit, are not played the backing track through their monitors and they sit motionless while the television and studio audience hear the song. Due to this error on the part of the BBC, the band are invited back the following week and insist on playing the song live.
5 August – The eight-part New Zealand thriller Steel Riders makes its debut on BBC1.
10 August – Debut of Crimewatch File, a BBC1 documentary series in which detectives tell the inside stories of some of the UK's major criminal investigations during which police appealed to viewers of Crimewatch for help.
19 August – Following concerns about the quality of TV-am's programming, an emergency meeting of the IBA considers whether to review the station's franchise in early 1989. However, it is ultimately decided not to proceed with the review since the next franchise round is approaching and the IBA feels the success of both organisations is mutually exclusive.
22 August – HTV begins 24-hour broadcasting.
31 August – ITV airs a version of The Hound of the Baskervilles, starring Jeremy Brett as Sherlock Holmes and Edward Hardwicke as Dr. Watson.

September
1 September – To celebrate BBC Radio 1's FM "switch on day", BBC1's Top of the Pops is simulcast with that station for the first time, allowing listeners to hear the programme in stereo. This edition is presented by Steve Wright and Mark Goodier. Top of the Pops is then simulcast weekly with Radio 1 until August 1991.
2 September – TSW, Grampian and Border begin 24-hour broadcasting.
5 September – BBC1 airs Bros Special, a 30-minute programme showing exclusive footage of pop band Bros in concert and on their UK tour. The programme is repeated on 29 December.
6 September – The animated series on Count Duckula makes its debut on Children's ITV, as a sequel to Danger Mouse and features the voice of David Jason.
7 September
Repeat showing of Paul Hamann's death row documentary Fourteen Days in May, telling the story of the final days of Edward Earl Johnson as he awaits execution on Mississippi's death row on BBC1. The film is followed on 14 September by The Journey, in which lawyer Clive Stafford Smith returns to Mississippi in an attempt to posthumously clear Johnson of the crimes to which he always professed his innocence.
BBC2 screen the Timewatch episode Shadow of the Ripper.  Written and hosted by Christopher Frayling, it  looks at the 100 year old Jack the Ripper murders.  
8 September – Channel 4 drops plans to invite Sinn Féin leader Gerry Adams to appear on an edition of its late-night discussion programme After Dark, following objections from other contributors.
9 September – Casualty returns to BBC1 for a third series, moving from its previous Saturday evening slot to Friday evenings.
12 September – Debut of Stoppit and Tidyup on BBC1. A 13-part animated series narrated by Terry Wogan and partly funded by the Tidy Britain Group charity.
13 September – The children's animated series PC Pinkerton makes its debut on BBC1. The show was produced by Trevor Bond who has also worked on the original Mr. Men series and Bananaman with veteran animation producer Terry Ward and featured the voice of Ian Lavender, best known for the playing the role of Private Pike in the hit sitcom Dad's Army.
14 September – Debut of the eight-part Australian series The True Story of Spit MacPhee on BBC1. It concludes on 2 November.
17 September–2 October – The 1988 Summer Olympics are held in Seoul, South Korea and broadcast to television audiences around the world. The BBC provides live coverage, as does ITV, in conjunction with Channel 4. This was to be the final time that ITV would broadcast the Olympic Games and Channel 4's only broadcast of the Olympics. ITV shows daytime coverage while Channel 4 airs the overnight and breakfast coverage.
18 September – Debut of the BBC political discussion programme On the Record, presented by Jonathan Dimbleby.
20 September – The actor Roy Kinnear dies at the age of 54 who the previous day had fallen from a horse during the making of The Return of the Musketeers in Toledo, Spain. He sustained a broken pelvis and internal bleeding and was taken to hospital in Madrid where he died from a heart attack, brought on by his injuries.
 23 September – Channel 4 launches the improvisational comedy game show Whose Line Is It Anyway?, presented by Clive Anderson and features numerous comedians and celebrities.
30 September – Presenters Mike Smith and Sarah Greene are seriously injured in a helicopter crash in Gloucestershire.

October
2 October – Debut of the long-running comedy sketch show Hale and Pace on ITV.  
3 October 
The magazine programme This Morning makes its debut on ITV. It is presented by Richard Madeley and Judy Finnigan until 2001 and is broadcast from the Albert Dock in Liverpool until 1996. 
Ulster is the last in the ITV network to begin 24-hour transmissions. 
The Oprah Winfrey Show makes its UK debut on Channel 4.
5 October – ITV begins airing the Australian soap Richmond Hill in a 2pm slot on Wednesdays and Thursdays, the first time the channel has networked an Australian soap. However, some regions, including Central and Granada opt out of networking the series when it is cancelled by Channel Ten the following year. 
6 October – Thames, Border, Tyne Tees and Ulster air the final episode of The Sullivans, becoming the first ITV regions to complete the series.
7 October – Launch of LWT's current affairs programme Friday Now!.
 11 October – ITV airs the first episode of the two-part miniseries, Jack the Ripper, starring Michael Caine, Lewis Collins and Jane Seymour. 
 14 October – Play School is broadcast for the final time on BBC1. The last new edition was shown in March.
 17 October 
Playbus, the replacement series for Play School makes its debut on BBC1. 
 The sitcom Wyatt's Watchdogs makes its debut on BBC1.
19 October – Home Secretary Douglas Hurd issues a notice under clause 13(4) of the BBC Licence and Agreement to the BBC and under section 29(3) of the Broadcasting Act 1981 to the IBA prohibiting the broadcast of direct statements by representatives or supporters of 11 Irish political and military organisations. The ban lasts until 1994 and denies the UK news media the right to broadcast the voices, though not the words, of all Irish republican and Loyalist paramilitaries. The restrictions, targeted primarily at Sinn Féin, means that actors are used to speak the words of any representative interviewed for radio and television.
20 October – Debut of the 13-part children's stop-motion animated series Charlie Chalk, produced by Woodland Animations, the company behind Postman Pat makes its debut on BBC1, featuring the voices of Barbara Leigh-Hunt, Michael Williams and John Wells. The last three episodes will air the following year.
23 October – The final episode of Channel 4's groundbreaking youth music and current affairs programme Network 7 is broadcast. 
25 October – As the 25th anniversary of the assassination of John F. Kennedy approaches, ITV airs the two-part documentary The Men Who Killed Kennedy, a film which explores discrepancies and inconsistencies in the US Government's official version of events.
30 October 
Following the signing of a new four-year deal to show exclusive live coverage of top flight English football, ITV begins showing a live game every Sunday afternoon.
First Born, a three-part adaptation of Maureen Duffy's novel Gor Saga, makes its debut on BBC1.

November
1 November – Having decided to step down from her presenting role on TV-am, Anne Diamond makes her final regular appearance on the station.
2 November 
In the House of Commons, an amendment introduced by the opposition, the Labour Party condemns the government's decision over the broadcasting ban as "incompatible with a free society" is rejected, despite some Conservative MPs voting with Labour.
Evacuation, an episode of ITV's The Bill features one of the series early prominent events, an explosion at Sun Hill police station.
7 November – A government white paper on broadcasting, Broadcasting in the '90s: Competition, Choice and Quality, includes provisions for a fifth UK television channel after management consultants Booz Allen recommend it as an option, claiming the extra channel would reduce the current ITV monopoly and also reduce advertising costs.
8 November – BBC1 airs Episode 523 of Neighbours, featuring the wedding of Scott Robinson and Charlene Mitchell, played by Jason Donovan and Kylie Minogue) which is watched by 20 million viewers.
13 November–18 December – The Lion, the Witch and the Wardrobe, one of C.S. Lewis's Chronicles of Narnia, is aired as a six-part TV serial on BBC1, starring Ronald Pickup, Barbara Kellerman and Michael Aldridge.
15 November – Debut of an educational documentary series called Secret Life of Machines on Channel 4. It is hosted by inventor and roboteer Rex Garrod and engineer, cartoonist, artist and writer Tim Hunkin who is also the creator of the series.
21 November – The Welsh children's series Fireman Sam is broadcast in Singapore for the first time, being shown on MediaCorp Channel 5.
23 November – The long-running BBC science fiction series Doctor Who celebrates its 25th anniversary and begins the three-part serial Silver Nemesis.
24 November – Frank Ruse, a left-wing Labour councillor for Liverpool City Council accompanies Liverpool's Pagoda Chinese Youth Orchestra to London for an appearance on Blue Peter. He is given a Blue Peter badge, but later receives a BBC-headed letter requesting its return. The letter, later discovered to be a forgery claims the programme had been approached by the office of Labour leader Neil Kinnock expressing concern that a councillor with hard-left views had been given a Blue Peter badge. Upon receiving the returned badge, the BBC writes back to Ruse stating that it had not sent the letter. The incident prompts Ruse to start an enquiry to find out who sent the hoax letter.

December
1 December – ITV's ORACLE Teletext service launches Park Avenue, a teletext-based soap opera. It is written by Robert Burns and runs until they lose its franchise at the end of 1992.
3 December – Comedian Steve Tandy wins New Faces of '88.
10 December 
ITV airs An Audience with Victoria Wood.
Channel 4 airs the marathon charity rock concert Human Rights Now!.
11 December – Launch date of the Astra Satellite. It will provide television coverage to Western Europe and is revolutionary as one of the first medium-powered satellites, allowing reception with smaller dishes than has previously been possible.
13 December – Central airs the final episode of Sons and Daughters, making it the first ITV region to complete the series.
18 December - The Flashing Blade airs for the last time on BBC1.
22 December – Singer Neneh Cherry performs her single Buffalo Stance on Top of the Pops while seven months pregnant, something that goes on to cause a furore in the media.
24 December – Christmas Eve highlights on BBC1 include the network television premiere of the 1985 family film Santa Claus: The Movie with Dudley Moore and the 1985 thriller Jagged Edge with Jeff Bridges and Glenn Close.
25 December 
The final edition of It's a Knockout to air on BBC1 is another celebrity special, It's a Charity Knockout From Walt Disney World, featuring teams of celebrities from the UK, the US and Australia. The series returns to S4C in 1991.
Ding Dong Merrily, the London's Burning Christmas special and the only episode of the series to have a title, airs on ITV as part of its Christmas Day lineup.
Christmas Day highlights on BBC1 include the network television premiere of Steven Spielberg and Robert Zemeckis' 1985 blockbuster sci-fi comedy Back to the Future, starring Michael J Fox and Christopher Lloyd, as well as the 1984 western adventure Silverado, starring Kevin Kline and Kevin Costner.
ITV's Christmas Day movie highlight is the network television premiere of the epic 1980 Star Wars sequel The Empire Strikes Back, starring Mark Hamill, Harrison Ford and Carrie Fisher.
26 December – BBC1 airs CivvyStreet, a spin-off episode of EastEnders, set during World War II. Later that same evening, the channel airs Bruce and Ronnie, a Christmas special presented by Bruce Forsyth and Ronnie Corbett who first appeared together at the 1988 Royal Variety Performance.
26–30 December – As part of a Christmas special, the Channel 4 soap Brookside airs five episodes over five consecutive days.
28 December – BBC1 airs the first part of the Australian film Bushfire Moon. The second part is shown on 30 December.
29 December – The network television premiere of Joe Dante's 1984 smash hit comedy horror movie Gremlins on ITV.
30 December – Channel 4 airs "The Cotton Collection", an evening of archive classic BBC programmes, including episodes of Frost Over England and Dad's Army.
31 December – New Year's Eve highlights on BBC1 include a special edition of Top of the Pops celebrating the programme's 25th anniversary and the network television premiere of Perry Mason in the Case of the Sinister Spirit.

Undated
Autumn – The BBC takes its first tentative steps into later closedowns. Previously, weekday programmes ended no later than 12:15am and weekend broadcasting at 1:30am.
 Swindon cable's TV channel is relaunched as Swindon's Local Channel. This sees the return to the service of local news, sport and one-off documentaries.

Debuts

BBC1
 1 January – Way Upstream (1987)
 3 January – First of the Summer Wine (1988–1989)
 11 January – Star Wars: Droids (1985–1986)
 16 January – Kissyfur (1986–1990)
 19 January – The Play on One (1988–1991)
 10 February – Moondial (1988)
 24 February – Gruey (1988–1989)
 5 April – Degrassi Junior High (1987–1989)

 19 April – Talking Heads (1988, 1998, 2020)
 3 May – 4 Square (1988–1991)
 17 May – The Lowdown (1988–1998)
 30 May – Tumbledown (1988)
 8 June – The Movie Game (1988–1995)
 1 July – The Flying Doctors (1986–1993)
 24 July – Countryfile (1988–present)
 3 September 
Noel's Saturday Roadshow (1988–1990)
Eggs 'n' Baker (1988–1993)
 5 September – No Frills (1988)
 12 September 
Stoppit and Tidyup (1988) 
Defenders of the Earth (1986)
 14 September – The True Story of Spit MacPhee (1988)
 15 September – The Snorks (1984–1989)
 18 September – On the Record (1988–2002)
 25 September – The Franchise Affair (1988)
 17 October 
Wyatt's Watchdogs (1988)
Playdays (1988–1997)
 20 October 
Charlie Chalk (1988–1989)
The River (1988)
 29 October – Hearts of Gold (1988–1996)
 30 October – First Born (1988)
 10 November – Thompson (1988)
 13 November – The Lion, the Witch and the Wardrobe (1988)
 4 December – The Rainbow (1988)
 5 December – Supersense (1988)
 21 December – Barney (1988–1989)
 23 December – Billy's Christmas Angels (1988)
 29 December – You Rang, M'Lord? (1988–1993)

BBC2
 4 January – Clarence (1988)
 12 January – Geordie Racer (1988)
 15 February – Red Dwarf (1988–1999, 2012–present)
 25 March – Two of Us (1987)
 13 April – Sophia and Constance (1988)
 9 May – DEF II (1988–1994)
 23 September – A Gentleman's Club (1988)
 3 October – Rapido (1988–1992)
 13 October – Alexei Sayle's Stuff (1988–1991)
 18 October – Colin's Sandwich (1988–1990)
 15 November – The Train Now Departing (1988)
 16 November – Christabel (1988)

ITV
 4 January – After Henry (1988–1992)
 6 January – Hannay (1988–1989)
 10 January – Closing Ranks (1988)
 11 January – The Real Ghostbusters (1986–1991)
 17 January – Wish Me Luck (1988–1990)
 18 January – Hard Cases (1988–1989)
 19 January – That's Love (1988–1992)
 24 January – Small World (1988)
 27 January – Singles (1988–1991)
 15 February – ITV News at 5:30 (1988–2012)
 17 February – The Fear (1988)
 20 February 
You Bet! (1988–1997)
London's Burning (1988–2002)
 22 February 
Andy Capp (1988)
News at Twelve (1988)
 13 March – Mr Majeika (1988–1990)
 14 March - South (1988)
 21 March – Lucky Ladders (1988–1993)
 29 March – Codename: Kyril (1988)
 10 April – Gentlemen and Players (1988–1989)
 17 April – All Clued Up (1988–1991)
 4 June – The One Game (1988)
 6 June – Masha's Adventures (1988–2008)
 19 July – Wheel of Fortune (1988–2001)
 26 July – I Can Do That (1988–1991)
 3 September 
The Hit Man and Her (1988–1992)
Motormouth (1988–1992)
Square Deal (1988–1989)
 5 September 
Jim Henson's Mother Goose Stories (1988–1990)
Tube Mice (1988)
 6 September – Count Duckula (1988–1993)
 7 September – Toksvig (1988)
23 September - Beauty and the Beast (1987-1990)
 2 October 
Piece of Cake (1988)
Hale and Pace (1988–1998)
 3 October 
Game, Set and Match (1988)
This Morning (1988—present)
 5 October – Richmond Hill (1988–1989)
 11 October 
Jack the Ripper (1988)
The Return of Shelley (1988–1992)
 14 October - A Taste for Death (1988)
 9 November 
The Ratties (1988)
Palace Hill (1988–1991)
 26 November – The Snow Spider (1988)
 27 November – The Beiderbecke Connection (1988)
 1 December – Park Avenue on ORACLE (1988–1992)
 3 December – How to Be Cool (1988)

Channel 4
6 January – Little Prince Cedie (1988)
 11 January – Fifteen to One (1988–2003, 2013–2019) 
 28 February – Helping Henry (1988)
 9 March – Chelmsford 123 (1988–1990)
 24 May – Echoes (1988)
 12 June – The StoryTeller (1987)
 19 June – A Very British Coup (1988)
 23 September – Whose Line Is It Anyway? (1988–1999)
 3 October – The Oprah Winfrey Show (1986–2011)
 31 October – This is David Lander (1988–1990)
 15 November – The Secret Life of Machines (1988–1993)
 30 December – Twelfth Night (1988)

Returning after a break of a year or longer
Shelley (1979–1984; 1988–1992) (as The Return of Shelley)

Ending this year
 2 January 
No. 73 (1982–1988)
Weekend World (1972–1988)
Let's Pretend (1982–1988)
Bad Boyes (1987–1988)
 13 January – Your Mother Wouldn't Like It (1985–1988)
 28 January – Yes Minister (1980–1988)
 30 January – Hi-De-Hi (1980–1988) 
 9 February – Running Loose (1986–1988)
 11 March – Play School (1964–1988)
 16 March – Moondial (1988)
 18 March 
 He-Man and the Masters of the Universe (1983–1988)
Rockliffe's Babies (1987–1988)
 4 April – Crossroads (1964–1988, 2001–2003)
 6 April – The Roxy (1987–1988)
 17 April – Hot Metal (1986–1988)
 28 April – Around the World with Willy Fog (1983)
 30 April - The Loud House (1979-1988)
 13 May – Tales of the Unexpected (1979–1988)
 22 May – East of the Moon (1988)
 30 May – All in Good Faith (1985–1988)
 12 June – Weekend World (1972–1988)
 23 August – Inspector Gadget (1984–1988)
 26 August – Child's Play (1984–1988)
 28 August – Get Fresh (1986–1988)
 10 October – Sorry! (1981–1982, 1985–1988)
 23 October – Network 7 (1987–1988)
 27 October – Beat the Teacher (1984–1988)
 29 November – Tickle on the Tum (1984–1988)
 1 December – Button Moon (1980–1988)
 3 December – New Faces (1973–1978, 1986–1988)
 5 December – Stoppit and Tidyup (1988)
 6 December – PC Pinkerton (1988)
 17 December – How to Be Cool (1988)
 22 December – The Ratties (1988)
 24 December – 3-2-1 (1978–1988)
 27 December – Executive Stress (1986–1988)
 31 December – Little Prince Cedie (1988)

Births
 14 January – Jack P. Shepherd, actor
 22 March – Gaz Beadle, TV personality
 28 March – Lacey Turner, actress
 5 July – Joe Lycett, comedian
 25 October – Rylan Clark, born Ross Clark, TV personality
 2 December – Alfred Enoch, actor

Deaths

See also
 1988 in British music
 1988 in British radio
 1988 in the United Kingdom
 List of British films of 1988

References